The modern combine harvester, or simply combine, is a machine designed to harvest a variety of grain crops. The name derives from its combining four separate harvesting operations—reaping, threshing, gathering, and winnowing—to a single process. Among the crops harvested with a combine are wheat, rice, oats, rye, barley, corn (maize), sorghum, soybeans, flax (linseed), sunflowers and rapeseed. The separated straw, left lying on the field, comprises the stems and any remaining leaves of the crop with limited nutrients left in it: the straw is then either chopped, spread on the field and ploughed back in or baled for bedding and limited-feed for livestock.

Combine harvesters are one of the most economically important labour-saving inventions, significantly reducing the fraction of the population engaged in agriculture.

History 

In 1826 in Scotland, the inventor Reverend Patrick Bell designed (but did not patent) a reaper machine, which used the scissors principle of plant cutting; a principle that is still used today. The Bell machine was pushed by horses. A few Bell machines were available in the United States. In 1835, in the United States, Hiram Moore built and patented the first combine harvester, which was capable of reaping, threshing and winnowing cereal grain. Early versions were pulled by horse, mule or ox teams. This combine harvester was pulled by 20 horses fully handled by farmhands. By 1860, combine harvesters with a cutting, or swathe, width of several metres were used on American farms.

A parallel development in Australia saw the development of the stripper based on the Gallic stripper, by John Ridley and others in South Australia by 1843. The stripper only gathered the heads, leaving the stems in the field. The stripper and later headers had the advantage of fewer moving parts and only collecting heads, requiring less power to operate. Refinements by Hugh Victor McKay produced a commercially successful combine harvester in 1885, the Sunshine Header-Harvester.

Combines, some of them quite large, were drawn by mule or horse teams and used a bullwheel to provide power. Later, steam power was used, and George Stockton Berry integrated the combine with a steam engine using straw to heat the boiler.  At the turn of the twentieth century, horse-drawn combines were starting to be used on the American plains and Idaho (often pulled by teams of twenty or more horses).

In 1911, the Holt Manufacturing Company of California, US produced a self-propelled harvester. In Australia in 1923, the patented Sunshine Auto Header was one of the first center-feeding self-propelled harvesters. In 1923 in Kansas, the Baldwin brothers and their Gleaner Manufacturing Company patented a self-propelled harvester that included several other modern improvements in grain handling. Both the Gleaner and the Sunshine used Fordson engines; early Gleaners used the entire Fordson chassis and driveline as a platform. In 1929, Alfredo Rotania of Argentina patented a self-propelled harvester.
International Harvester started making horse-pulled combines in 1915. At the time, horse powered binders and stand alone threshing machines were more common. In the 1920s, Case Corporation and John Deere made combines and these were starting to be tractor pulled with a second engine aboard the combine to power its workings. The world economic collapse in the 1930s stopped farm equipment purchases, and for this reason, people largely retained the older method of harvesting. A few farms did invest and used Caterpillar tractors to move the outfits.

Tractor-drawn combines (also called pull-type combines) became common after World War II as many farms began to use tractors. An example was the All-Crop Harvester series. These combines used a shaker to separate the grain from the chaff and straw-walkers (grates with small teeth on an eccentric shaft) to eject the straw while retaining the grain. Early tractor-drawn combines were usually powered by a separate gasoline engine, while later models were PTO-powered, via a shaft transferring tractor engine power to operate the combine. These machines either put the harvested crop into bags that were then loaded onto a wagon or truck, or had a small bin that stored the grain until it was transferred via a chute.

In the U.S., Allis-Chalmers, Massey-Harris, International Harvester, Gleaner Manufacturing Company, John Deere, and Minneapolis Moline are past or present major combine producers.
In 1937, the Australian-born Thomas Carroll, working for Massey-Harris in Canada, perfected a self-propelled model and in 1940, a lighter-weight model began to be marketed widely by the company. Lyle Yost invented an auger that would lift grain out of a combine in 1947, making unloading grain much easier and further from the combine. In 1952 Claeys launched the first self-propelled combine harvester in Europe; in 1953, the European manufacturer Claas developed a self-propelled combine harvester named 'Hercules', it could harvest up to 5 tons of wheat a day. This newer kind of combine is still in use and is powered by diesel or gasoline engines. Until the self-cleaning rotary screen was invented in the mid-1960s combine engines suffered from overheating as the chaff spewed out when harvesting small grains would clog radiators, blocking the airflow needed for cooling.

A significant advance in the design of combines was the rotary design. The grain is initially stripped from the stalk by passing along a helical rotor, instead of passing between rasp bars on the outside of a cylinder and a concave. Rotary combines were first introduced by Sperry-New Holland in 1975.

Around the 1980s, on-board electronics were introduced to measure threshing efficiency. This new instrumentation allowed operators to get better grain yields by optimizing ground speed and other operating parameters.

Combine header
Combines are equipped with removable headers that are designed for particular crops. The standard header, sometimes called a grain platform, is equipped with a reciprocating knife cutter bar, and features a revolving reel with metal teeth to cause the cut crop to fall into the auger once it is cut.  A variation of the platform, a "flex" platform, is similar but has a cutter bar that can flex over contours and ridges to cut soybeans that have pods close to the ground. A flex head can cut soybeans as well as cereal crops, while a rigid platform is generally used only in cereal grains.

Some wheat headers, called "draper" headers, use a fabric or rubber apron instead of a cross auger. Draper headers allow faster feeding than cross augers, leading to higher throughputs due to lower power requirements. On many farms, platform headers are used to cut wheat, instead of separate wheat headers, so as to reduce overall costs.

Dummy heads or pick-up headers feature spring-tined pickups, usually attached to a heavy rubber belt. They are used for crops that have already been cut and placed in windrows or swaths. This is particularly useful in northern climates such as western Canada, where swathing kills weeds resulting in a faster dry down.

While a grain platform can be used for corn, a specialized corn head is ordinarily used instead. The corn head is equipped with snap rolls that strip the stalk and leaf away from the ear, so that only the ear (and husk) enter the throat. This improves efficiency dramatically since so much less material must go through the cylinder.  The corn head can be recognized by the presence of points between each row.

Occasionally rowcrop heads are seen that function like a grain platform but have points between rows like a corn head. These are used to reduce the amount of weed seed picked up when harvesting small grains.

Self-propelled Gleaner combines could be fitted with special tracks instead of tires to assist in harvesting rice. These tracks can be made to fit other combines by adding adapter plates. Some combines, particularly the pull type, have tires with a deep diamond tread which prevents sinking in mud.

Conventional combine
The cut crop is carried up the feeder throat (commonly called the "feederhouse"), by a chain and flight elevator, then fed into the threshing mechanism of the combine, consisting of a rotating threshing drum (commonly called the "cylinder"), to which grooved steel bars (rasp bars) are bolted.  The rasp bars thresh or separate the grains and chaff from the straw through the action of the cylinder against the concave, a shaped "half drum", also fitted with steel bars and a meshed grill, through which grain, chaff and smaller debris may fall, whereas the straw, being too long, is carried through onto the straw walkers. This action is also allowed because grain is heavier than straw, which causes it to fall rather than "float" across from the cylinder/concave to the walkers. The drum speed is variably adjustable on most machines, whilst the distance between the drum and concave is finely adjustable fore, aft and together, to achieve optimum separation and output. Manually engaged disawning plates are usually fitted to the concave. These provide extra friction to remove the awns from barley crops. After the primary separation at the cylinder, the clean grain falls through the concave and to the shoe, which contains the chaffer and sieves. The shoe is common to both conventional combines and rotary combines.

Hillside leveling

In the Palouse region of the Pacific Northwest of the United States the combine is retrofitted with a hydraulic hillside leveling system. This allows the combine to harvest the steep but fertile soil in the region. Hillsides can be as steep as a 50% slope. Gleaner, IH and Case IH, John Deere, and others all have made combines with this hillside leveling system, and local machine shops have fabricated them as an aftermarket add-on.

The first leveling technology was developed by Holt Co., a US company in California, in 1891. Modern leveling came into being with the invention and patent of a level sensitive mercury switch system invented by Raymond Alvah Hanson in 1946. Raymond's son, Raymond Jr., produced leveling systems exclusively for John Deere combines until 1995 as R. A. Hanson Company, Inc. In 1995, his son, Richard, purchased the company from his father and renamed it RAHCO International, Inc. In March 2011, the company was renamed Hanson Worldwide, LLC. Production continues to this day.

Hillside leveling has several advantages. Primary among them is an increased threshing efficiency on hillsides. Without leveling, grain and chaff slide to one side of separator and come through the machine in a large ball rather than being separated, dumping large amounts of grain on the ground. By keeping the machinery level, the straw-walker is able to operate more efficiently, making for more efficient threshing. IH produced the 453  combine which leveled both side-to-side and front-to-back, enabling efficient threshing whether on a hillside or climbing a hill head on.

Secondarily, leveling changes a combine's center of gravity relative to the hill and allows the combine to harvest along the contour of a hill without tipping, a danger on the steeper slopes of the region; it is not uncommon for combines to roll over on extremely steep hills.

Newer leveling systems do not have as much tilt as the older ones. A John Deere 9600 combine equipped with a Rahco hillside conversion kit will level to 44%, while the newer STS combines will only go to 35%. These modern combines use the rotary grain separator which makes leveling less critical. Most combines on the Palouse have dual drive wheels on each side to stabilize them.

A leveling system was developed in Europe by the Italian combine manufacturer Laverda, which still produces it today.

Sidehill leveling
Sidehill combines are very similar to hillside combines in that they level the combine to the ground so that the threshing can be efficiently conducted; however, they have some very distinct differences. Modern hillside combines level around 35% on average, while older machines were closer to 50%. Sidehill combines only level to 18%. They are sparsely used in the Palouse region. Rather, they are used on the gentle rolling slopes of the midwest. Sidehill combines are much more mass-produced than their hillside counterparts. The height of a sidehill machine is the same height as a level-land combine.  Hillside combines have added steel that sets them up approximately 2–5 feet higher than a level-land combine and provide a smooth ride.

Maintaining threshing speed

Another technology that is sometimes used on combines is a continuously variable transmission. This allows the ground speed of the machine to be varied while maintaining a constant engine and threshing speed. It is desirable to keep the threshing speed constant since the machine will typically have been adjusted to operate best at a certain speed.

Self-propelled combines started with standard manual transmissions that provided one speed based on input rpm.  Deficiencies were noted and in the early 1950s combines were equipped with what John Deere called the "Variable Speed Drive". This was simply a variable width sheave controlled by spring and hydraulic pressures. This sheave was attached to the input shaft of the transmission. A standard 4 speed manual transmission was still used in this drive system. The operator would select a gear, typically 3rd. An extra control was provided to the operator to allow him to speed up and slow down the machine within the limits provided by the variable speed drive system.  By decreasing the width of the sheave on the input shaft of the transmission, the belt would ride higher in the groove. This slowed the rotating speed on the input shaft of the transmission, thus slowing the ground speed for that gear.  A clutch was still provided to allow the operator to stop the machine and change transmission gears.

Later, as hydraulic technology improved, hydrostatic transmissions were introduced by Versatile Mfg for use on swathers but later this technology was applied to combines as well. This drive retained the 4 speed manual transmission as before, but this time used a system of hydraulic pumps and motors to drive the input shaft of the transmission. This system is called a Hydrostatic drive system. This pressure is then directed to the hydraulic motor that is connected to the input shaft of the transmission. The operator is provided with a lever in the cab that allows for the control of the hydraulic motor's ability to use the energy provided by the pump. By adjusting the swash plate in the motor, the stroke of its pistons are changed. If the swash plate is set to neutral, the pistons do not move in their bores and no rotation is allowed, thus the machine does not move. By moving the lever, the swash plate moves its attached pistons forward, thus allowing them to move within the bore and causing the motor to turn. This provides an infinitely variable speed control from 0 ground speed to what ever the maximum speed is allowed by the gear selection of the transmission. The standard clutch was removed from this drive system as it was no longer needed.

Most if not all modern combines are equipped with hydrostatic drives.  These are larger versions of the same system used in consumer and commercial lawn mowers that most are familiar with today.  In fact, it was the downsizing of the combine drive system that placed these drive systems into mowers and other machines.

The threshing process

Despite great advances in mechanics and computer control, the basic operation of the combine harvester has remained unchanged almost since it was invented.

Power requirements over the years have increased due to larger capacities and some processes such as rotary threshing and straw chopping take considerable power.  This is sometimes supplied by a large tractor in a pull-type combine, or a large gasoline or diesel engine in a self-propelled type.  A frequent problem is the presence of airborne chaff and straw, which can accumulate causing a fire hazard and to radiators which can become plugged.  Most machines have addressed these problems with enclosed engine compartments and rotary centrifugal inlet screens which prevent chaff buildup.

First, the header, described above, cuts the crop and feeds it into the threshing cylinder. This consists of a series of horizontal rasp bars fixed across the path of the crop and in the shape of a quarter cylinder. Moving rasp bars or rub bars pull the crop through concaved grates that separate the grain and chaff from the straw. The grain heads fall through the fixed concaves. What happens next is dependent on the type of combine in question. In most modern combines, the grain is transported to the shoe by a set of 2, 3, or 4 (possibly more on the largest machines) augers, set parallel or semi-parallel to the rotor on axial mounted rotors and perpendicular on "Axial Flow" combines.

In older Gleaner machines, these augers were not present. Those combines are unique in that the cylinder and concave is set inside feederhouse instead of in the machine directly behind the feederhouse. Consequently, the material was moved by a "raddle chain" from underneath the concave to the walkers. The clean grain fell between the raddle and the walkers onto the shoe, while the straw, being longer and lighter, floated across onto the walkers to be expelled. On most other older machines, the cylinder was placed higher and farther back in the machine, and the grain moved to the shoe by falling down a "clean grain pan", and the straw "floated" across the concaves to the back of the walkers.

Since the Sperry-New Holland TR70 Twin-Rotor Combine came out in 1975, most manufacturers have combines with rotors in place of conventional cylinders. However, makers have now returned to the market with conventional models alongside their rotary line-up. A rotor is a long, longitudinally mounted rotating cylinder with plates similar to rub bars (except for in the above-mentioned Gleaner rotaries).

There are usually two sieves, one above the other. The sieves are basically metal frames that have many rows of "fingers" set reasonably close together. The angle of the fingers is adjustable, to change the clearance and thereby control the size of material passing through. The top is set with more clearance than the bottom to allow a gradual cleaning action. Setting the concave clearance, fan speed, and sieve size is critical to ensure that the crop is threshed properly, the grain is clean of debris, and all of the grain entering the machine reaches the grain tank or 'hopper'. (Observe, for example, that when travelling uphill the fan speed must be reduced to account for the shallower gradient of the sieves.)

Heavy material, e.g., unthreshed heads, fall off the front of the sieves and are returned to the concave for re-threshing.

The straw walkers are located above the sieves, and also have holes in them. Any grain remaining attached to the straw is shaken off and falls onto the top sieve.

When the straw reaches the end of the walkers it falls out the rear of the combine. It can then be baled for cattle bedding or spread by two rotating straw spreaders with rubber arms. Most modern combines are equipped with a straw spreader.

Rather than immediately falling out the rear of the combine at the end of the walkers, there are models of combine harvesters from Eastern Europe and Russia (e.g. Agromash Yenisei 1200 1 HM, etc.) that have "straw catchers" at the end of the walkers, which temporarily hold the straw and then, once full, deposit it in a stack for easy gathering.

Thresher designs 

For  some time, combine harvesters used the conventional design, which used a rotating cylinder at the front-end which knocked the seeds out of the heads, and then used the rest of the machine to separate the straw from the chaff, and the chaff from the grain. The TR70 from Sperry-New Holland was brought out in 1975 as the first rotary combine. Other manufacturers soon followed, International Harvester with their 'Axial Flow' in 1977 and Gleaner with their N6 in 1979.

In the decades before the widespread adoption of the rotary combine in the late seventies, several inventors had pioneered designs which relied more on centrifugal force for grain separation and less on gravity alone.  By the early eighties, most major manufacturers had settled on a "walkerless" design with much larger threshing cylinders to do most of the work.  Advantages were faster grain harvesting and gentler treatment of fragile seeds, which were often cracked by the faster rotational speeds of conventional combine threshing cylinders.

It was the disadvantages of the rotary combine (increased power requirements and over-pulverization of the straw by-product) which prompted a resurgence of conventional combines in the late nineties. Perhaps overlooked but nonetheless true, when the large engines that powered the rotary machines were employed in conventional machines, the two types of machines delivered similar production capacities.  Also, research was beginning to show that incorporating above-ground crop residue (straw) into the soil is less useful for rebuilding soil fertility than previously believed. This meant that working pulverized straw into the soil became more of a hindrance than a benefit.  An increase in feedlot beef production also created a higher demand for straw as fodder. Conventional combines, which use straw walkers, preserve the quality of straw and allow it to be baled and removed from the field.

Instrumentation
While the principles of basic threshing have changed little over the years, modern advancements in electronics and monitoring technology has continued to develop.  Whereas older machines required the operator to rely on machine knowledge, frequent inspection and monitoring, and a keen ear to listen for subtle sound changes, newer machines have replaced many of those duties with instrumentation.

Shaft monitors
Early on, simple magnetic pickups were used to monitor shaft rotation, and issue a warning when they deviated beyond preset limits.  Temperature sensors can also give warning when bearings overheat due to lack of lubrication, sometimes leading to combine fires.

Loss monitors
The job of monitoring how much grain is wasted by the thresher by being discharged with the chaff and straw used to require going behind the machine to check.  Yield monitors work like a microphone, registering an electrical impulse caused by grains impacting a plate.  A meter in the operator's cab displays the relative amount of grain loss proportional to speed.

Yield monitoring
Measuring the amount of yield (bushels per acre or tonnes per hectare) has become increasingly important, particularly when real-time measurement can help determine which areas of a field are more or less productive.  These variations can often be remediated with variable crop inputs.  Yield is determined by measuring the amount of grain harvested in relation to the area covered.

Cameras

Cameras placed at strategic points on the machine can eliminate some of the guesswork for the operator.

Field mapping
The advent of GPS and GIS technologies has made it possible to create field maps, which can assist in navigation, and in the preparation of yield maps, which show which parts of the field are more productive.

Combine size classification 
While all combines aim to achieve the same result, each machine can be classified based on its general throughput which is based upon the rated horsepower rating of the combine. Currently combine classifications, as defined by Association of Equipment Manufacturers (AEM), are as follows:

 Class VI - 268 HP - 323 HP
 Class VII - 324 HP - 375 HP
 Class VIII - 376 HP - 485 HP
 Class IX - 486 HP - 674 HP
 Class X - 675 HP+
While this classification is current, the classes themselves have and will evolve over time. For instance, a class 7 (VII) combine in the year 1980 would only have 270 horsepower and been one of the largest machines available in the world at that time but in the 21st century the same machine would be considered small.

Combine fires
Grain combine fires are responsible for millions of dollars of loss each year. Fires usually start near the engine where dust and dry crop debris accumulate. Fires can also start when heat is introduced by bearings or gearboxes that have failed. From 1984 to 2000, 695 major grain combine fires were reported to U.S. local fire departments. Dragging chains to reduce static electricity was one method employed for preventing harvester fires, but it is not yet clear what if any role static electricity plays in causing harvester fires. The application of the appropriate synthetic greases will reduce the friction experienced at crucial points (i.e., chains, sprockets and gear boxes) compared to petroleum based lubricants. Engines with synthetic lubricants will also remain significantly cooler during operation.

See also

Agricultural machinery
Combine Demolition Derby
Custom harvesting
Museum of Scottish Country Life – Largest collection of combine harvesters in Europe.

References

Notes

Bibliography

External links

 Worldwide Agricultural Machinery and Farm Equipment Directory
 "Gold Harvest Feeds The World" page 90 Popular Mechanics, July 1949, cutaway illustration of the John Deere open cab one-man self-propelled combine of the type common for decades after World War Two
 Pictures of combines with corn and wheat heads 
 History of Sunshine Harvesters – Museum Victoria, Australia
 The Birth of the Australian Stripping Combine Harvester
 Pictures of Gleaner levelling combines
 The Combine Talk Forums – A Website with more information and pictures
 Washington State University film of horse-drawn combine in 1938 

Agricultural machinery
 
Harvesters
Vehicles introduced in 1834
Grain production